Fix My Brain is the third studio album by the Denton, Texas punk rock band The Marked Men, released May 16, 2006, by Swami Records.

Track listing
All songs written by The Marked Men
"A Little Time" – 2:02
"Sully My Name" – 2:06
"It's Not a Crime" – 1:53
"A Little Lesson" – 2:34
"Wait Here, Wait for You" – 2:04
"Sophisticate" – 1:35
"Someday" – 2:17
"Fix My Brain" – 2:36
"Going Crazy" – 2:22
"You Said Enough" – 2:38
"Don't Look at Me" – 2:34
"Sadist" – 2:55
"Stay Home" – 2:09

Personnel 
Jeff Burke – guitar, lead vocals
Mark Ryan – guitar, lead vocals, cover design
Joe Ayoub – bass guitar
Mike Throneberry – drum kit, backing vocals
Dave Gardner – mastering
Krissy Throneberry – cover photo
Recorded, engineered, produced, and mixed by The Marked Men

References

2006 albums
The Marked Men albums
Swami Records albums